Lincoln Elementary School is a common name for elementary schools in the U.S. It may refer specifically to:
Lincoln Elementary School (Newark, California), part of the Newark Unified School District
Lincoln Elementary School (Oakland, California)
Abraham Lincoln Elementary School (Pomona, California)
Lincoln Elementary School (Denver, Colorado), a Denver Landmark
Abraham Lincoln Elementary School (Chicago), Illinois - See List of Chicago Public Schools
Lincoln Elementary School (Manchester, Iowa), listed on the NRHP in Iowa
Abraham Lincoln Elementary, in Medford, Oregon
 The former Woodrow Wilson Junior High School (Eugene, Oregon), which was renamed Lincoln Elementary School several decades before its closure
Lincoln Elementary School (Pittsburgh, Pennsylvania), listed on the National Register of Historic Places in Pennsylvania
Lincoln Elementary School (Ellensburg, Washington), part of the Ellensburg School District

See also
 Lincoln School (disambiguation)
 Lincoln Middle School (disambiguation)